Pleasures Pave Sewers is the debut album of grindcore band Lock Up, a side project of Napalm Death, featuring Peter Tägtgren on vocals. According to engineer Andy Sneap, the album was recorded in a day and was never mixed.

Background 
According to Shane Embury, the origins of the project go back to the time Napalm Death were working on the Words from the Exit Wound album. In 2010 he told Kerrang!:

Track listing

  "After Life in Purgatory"  (2:08)  
  "Submission"  (2:46)  
  "Triple Six Suck Angels"  (2:58)  
  "Delirium"  (1:56)  
  "Pretenders of the Throne"  (1:45)  
  "Slow Bleed Gorgon / Pleasures Pave Sewers"  (3:36)  
  "Ego Pawn"  (1:53)  
  "The Dreams Are Sacrificed"  (2:06)  
  "Tragic Faith"  (2:30)  
  "Darkness of Ignorance"  (2:23)  
  "Salvation thru' Destruction"  (2:24)  
  "Leech Eclipse"  (0:56)  
  "Fever Landscapes"  (1:47)

Credits
 Peter Tägtgren - Vocals
 Nicholas Barker - Drums
 Shane Embury - Bass
 Jesse Pintado - Guitars

References 

Lock Up (British band) albums
1999 debut albums